Neotama is a genus of tree trunk spiders that was first described by M. Baehr & B. Baehr in 1993.

Species
 it contains nine species:
Neotama corticola (Lawrence, 1937) – South Africa
Neotama cunhabebe Rheims & Brescovit, 2004 – Peru, Brazil
Neotama forcipata (F. O. Pickard-Cambridge, 1902) – Mexico to El Salvador
Neotama longimana Baehr & Baehr, 1993 – Indonesia (Java, Sumatra)
Neotama mexicana (O. Pickard-Cambridge, 1893) – USA to Peru, Guyana
Neotama obatala Rheims & Brescovit, 2004 – Peru, Brazil, Guyana
Neotama punctigera Baehr & Baehr, 1993 – India
Neotama rothorum Baehr & Baehr, 1993 – India
Neotama variata (Pocock, 1899) (type) – Sri Lanka

References

Araneomorphae genera
Hersiliidae
Spiders of Africa
Spiders of Asia
Spiders of North America
Spiders of South America